Mexico-Nigeria relations are the diplomatic relations between Mexico and Nigeria. Both nations are members of the Group of 15, Group of 24 and the United Nations.

History 
Mexico and Nigeria are two regional power nations in Latin America and Africa, respectively. Both nations established diplomatic relations with each other on 14 April 1976. Three months after establishing diplomatic relations, Mexico opened an embassy in Lagos, however, the embassy was closed in 1979 due to financial restraints. In 1981, Nigeria opened an embassy in Mexico City and later closed its diplomatic mission two years later in 1983. Nigeria re-opened its embassy in Mexico in 2000 and Mexico followed suit by opening an embassy in Abuja (the new capital of Nigeria since 1991) in 2008.

In 1981, Nigerian President Shehu Shagari attended a summit for Heads of States in Cancun where he met with his counterpart, Mexican President José López Portillo and leaders of other nations. Since 2000, bilateral relations and high level meetings between both nations have steadily increased. In March 2002, Nigerian President Olusegun Obasanjo paid his first visit to Mexico to attend the Monterrey Consensus held in the norther Mexican city of Monterrey. In September 2002, President Vicente Fox became the first Mexican head-of-state to pay an official visit to Nigeria. In September 2005, Nigerian President Olusegun Obasanjo paid a second visit to Mexico.

In March 2013, Mexican Foreign Undersecretary Lourdes Aranda Bezaury paid a visit to Nigeria and met with President Goodluck Jonathan. In 2014, Jim O'Neill, Baron O'Neill of Gatley, known for coining the term BRIC in 2001, coined the new term MINT, Mexico, Indonesia, Nigeria, and Turkey, to define those high-growth markets within the BRIC. That same year, the Mexican embassy in Nigeria launched the Nigerian-Mexican Chamber of Commerce and Industry (NMCCI) to promote business between the two countries. In 2016, Mexico and Nigeria celebrated 40 years of diplomatic relations.

In February 2020, Mexican customs confiscated a Yoruba ancient bronze sculpture and returned it to Nigeria, The sculpture was later declared to be a fake according to the curator of the Royal Museum for Central Africa in Tervuren, Belgium.

High-level visits

High-level visits from Mexico to Nigeria
 President Vicente Fox (2002)
 Special Envoy Roberto Zapata Barradas (2013)
 Foreign Undersecretary Lourdes Aranda Bezaury (2013)
 Director General of ProMéxico Francisco González Díaz (2016, 2018)
 Director General for Africa and the Middle East Jorge Álvarez Fuentes (2018)

High-level visits from Nigeria to Mexico
 President Shehu Shagari (1981)
 President Olusegun Obasanjo (2002, 2005)
 Deputy Finance Minister Yerima Lawan Ngama (2013)
 Finance Minister Ngozi Okonjo-Iweala (2014)

Bilateral agreements 
Both nations have signed several bilateral agreements such as an Agreement for Educative and Cultural Cooperation (1999); Agreement to Establish Consultations on Mutual Interests (2012); Memorandum of Understanding between ProMéxico and the Council for the Promotion of Exports of Nigeria (2015); Memorandum of Understanding between Bancomext and the Nigerian Bank for Exports and Imports (2015); and a Memorandum of Understanding between the National Universities Commission of Nigeria and the National Association of Universities and Institutions of Higher Education of Mexico (2016).

Trade relations 
In 2018, trade between the two nations totaled US$183 million. Mexico's main exports to Nigeria include: building materials, tequila, cement, machinery and electronics. Nigeria's main exports to Mexico include: natural gas and sesame seeds. Nigeria is Mexico's 55th biggest trading partner globally and second biggest trading partner in Africa (after South Africa). Mexican multinational companies such as Cemex and Grupo Bimbo operate in Nigeria. 

In January 2020, the Nigerian mobile payment startup Paga announced the launch of its operations in Mexico and Latin America. In March 2020, both countries' oil assets were downgraded in the S&P Global ratings. In September 2020, Shell announced its intention to focus its oil activities on Nigeria and Mexico (and the Northern Sea) to cut costs.

Resident diplomatic missions 
 Mexico has an embassy in Abuja.
 Nigeria has an embassy in Mexico City.

See also 
MINT

References

 
Nigeria
Bilateral relations of Nigeria